The 1968 NAIA Soccer Championship was the tenth annual tournament held by the NAIA to determine the national champion of men's college soccer among its members in the United States.

Davis & Elkins defeated hosts and two-time defending champions Quincy (IL) in the final, 2–1 after five overtime periods, to claim the Senators' first NAIA national title. This was the first NAIA national championship game to go into extra time. 

The final was again played at Quincy College in Quincy, Illinois.

Qualification
The tournament field expanded for the first time in 1968, increasing from four to eight. The tournament format, meanwhile, remained single-elimination format, but added additional matches to determine the teams in fifth to eighth place, increasing the number of matches from 4 to 12.

Bracket

† Eastern Connecticut was awarded victory after two overtimes for having most corner kicks.

See also  
 1968 NCAA Soccer Championship

References 

NAIA championships
NAIA
1968 in sports in Illinois